Munmun Timothy Lugun (born 5 May 1993) is an Indian professional footballer who plays as a left back for Kerala United FC in I-League 2nd Division.

Career
Born in Delhi, Lugun started his football career with Simla Youngs in the I-League 2nd Division. He also captained his state youth team during the B.C. Roy Trophy in 2010. In 2012 Lugun signed with United Sikkim for their 2nd Division campaign and helped the club earn promotion to the I-League. He made his professional debut for the club in the I-League in their opening match against Salgaocar on 6 October 2012. Lugun started and played the full match as United Sikkim won 3–2. By the end of the season, despite the club being relegated, Lugun himself started and played 24 of United Sikkim's 26 matches.

After United Sikkim were relegated, Lugun signed with another I-League side, Rangdajied United. He made his debut for the club on 22 September 2013 against Prayag United. He started and played the full match as Rangdajied United lost 2–0. Then, after the 2013–14 I-League season, Lugun was selected by the Delhi Dynamos in the Indian Super League domestic draft for the inaugural season. Lugun only made one appearance for the Delhi side during the season, on 28 November 2014 against Mumbai City. He started and played the full match as Delhi Dynamos won 4–1.

On 22 December 2014, after the ISL season, Lugun signed with Pune for the 2014–15 I-League. He made his debut for the side on 14 February 2015 against Dempo. Lugun came on as a 72nd minute substitute for Yumnam Raju as Pune and Dempo drew the match 0–0.

On 25 March 2016 it was announced that Lugun would be part of the Minerva Academy squad in the I-League 2nd Division. After the 2nd Division season, in September 2016 it was revealed that Lugun had signed with Indian Super League side Mumbai City.

Career statistics

Honours

Club
United Sikkim
I-League 2nd Division: 2012

References

External links 
 Indian Super League Profile.

1993 births
Living people
People from Delhi
Indian footballers
United Sikkim F.C. players
Rangdajied United F.C. players
Odisha FC players
Pune FC players
RoundGlass Punjab FC players
Mumbai City FC players
Mumbai FC players
Association football defenders
Footballers from Delhi
I-League 2nd Division players
I-League players
Indian Super League players